Berlin-Karow station is a railway station on the Berlin–Szczecin railway in the Pankow district of Berlin. It is served by the S-Bahn line  and the line NE27 (also known as the Heidekrautbahn), operated by the Niederbarnimer Eisenbahn.

2009 Train Collision
On 17 April 2009, twenty-four people were injured when a regional train from Stralsund, Mecklenburg-Vorpommern, crashed into a freight train carrying propane, north of Berlin. The passengers and railway staff were hurt in the accident which took place 250m outside of Berlin-Karow railway station. Nine of the injured, five of them in critical condition, were taken to nearby hospitals.

References

Karow
Karow
Karow
Railway stations in Germany opened in 1882